Patrick (Pat) Carroll (March, 1853 – February 14, 1916) was an American Major League Baseball catcher who played for the Altoona Mountain City and the Philadelphia Keystones, both of the Union Association, in 1884.

In 16 total games he was 16-for-68 (.235) and scored 5 runs.  He was a slightly below-average defensive catcher for his era, making 13 errors in 106 total chances (.877).  In three of his games, Carroll was a right fielder, and made no errors while playing that position.

He died in his hometown of Philadelphia, Pennsylvania.

External links
Baseball Reference
Retrosheet

1853 births
1916 deaths
Major League Baseball catchers
Baseball players from Pennsylvania
Altoona Mountain Citys players
Philadelphia Keystones players
19th-century baseball players
Springfield, Ohio (minor league baseball) players